The Environmental Protection Agency (EPA) is responsible for protecting and improving the environment as a valuable asset for the people of Ireland. It operates independently under the Department of the Environment, Climate and Communications.

History

The EPA was founded in 1993, following the enactment of the Environmental Protection Agency Act 1992. In 2014, it merged with the Radiological Protection Institute of Ireland, which was itself founded in 1992. The present-day EPA continues the activities of both groups.

Organisation
The EPA operates independently under the Department of the Environment, Climate and Communications. It is led by an advisory committee headed by a director general. The current director general, Laura Burke, was appointed in 2011.

Offices
There are five offices which answer to the advisory committee.
 The Office of Environmental Enforcement is responsible for implementing and enforcing environmental legislation.
 The Office of Environmental Sustainability is responsible for advocating for environmental protection and sustainability, with a goal in particular to meet Ireland's multiple environmental commitments.
 The Office of Evidence and Assessment is responsible for providing environmental data, information and assessment.
 The Office of Radiation Protection and Environmental Monitoring - responsible for ensuring that the public is protected from the effects of harmful ionizing radiation.
 The Office of Communications and Corporate Services - responsible for providing support for all staff across the EPA.

Sites

The EPA operates from a number of sites across Ireland. The Headquarters are located in Johnstown Castle Estate, County Wexford.

Additional offices are located in:
 Dublin
 Inniscarra, County Cork
 Castlebar, County Mayo
 Monaghan
 Kilkenny
 Athlone, County Westmeath
 Limerick

See also

 Conservation biology
 Ecology
 Environmental protection
 Habitat conservation
 Natural environment
 Natural capital
 Natural resource
 Renewable resource
 Sustainable development
 Sustainability

References

External links
Environmental Protection Agency - Ireland

Ireland
Government agencies of the Republic of Ireland
Environmental organisations based in Ireland
Environment of the Republic of Ireland
State-sponsored bodies of the Republic of Ireland
Department of the Environment, Climate and Communications
Radiation protection organizations